Feroge (Feroghe), endonym Kaligi, is a Ubangian language of South Sudan.

As of 2013, ethnic Feroghe resided in Raja North boma, Raja payam, Raja County.

References

Languages of South Sudan
Sere languages